British Standard BS 7671 "Requirements for Electrical Installations. IET Wiring Regulations", informally called in the UK electrical community "The Regs",  is the national standard in the United Kingdom for electrical installation and the safety of electrical wiring in domestic, commercial, industrial, and other buildings, also in special installations and locations, such as marinas or caravan parks and medical locations

In general, BS 7671 applies to circuits supplied at nominal voltages (Uo) up to and including 1000 volts AC or 1500 volts DC. The standard therefore covers the Extra Low Voltage (ELV) range (0-50V AC, 0-125V DC), and the Low Voltage (LV) range (50-1000V AC, 125-1500V DC). The frequencies covered for AC are 50 Hz, 60 Hz, and 400 Hz, used in the UK for houses, offices, and commerce. It did not become a recognized British Standard until the publication of the 16th edition in 1992. The standard takes account of the technical substance of agreements reached in CENELEC.

The current version is BS 7671:2018 (the 18th Edition) issued in 2018 and came into effect from 1 January 2019. Amendment 2 to the 18th Edition was published in March 2022. BS 7671 is also used as a national standard by Mauritius, St Lucia, Saint Vincent and the Grenadines, Sierra Leone, Singapore, Sri Lanka, Trinidad and Tobago, Uganda, Cyprus, and several other countries, which base their wiring regulations on BS 7671.

Compilation and publication
The standard is maintained by the Joint IET/BSI Technical Committee JPEL/64, the UK National Committee for Wiring Regulations, and published by the IET (formerly IEE). Although the IET and BSI are non-governmental organisations and the Wiring Regulations are non-statutory, they are referenced in several UK statutory instruments, and in most cases, for practical purposes, have legal force as the appropriate method of electric wiring.

The BSI (British Standards Institute) publishes numerous titles concerning acceptable standards of design/safety/quality across different fields.

History of BS 7671 and predecessor standards 

The first edition was published in 1882 as the "Rules and Regulations for the Prevention of Fire Risks arising from Electric Lighting."  The title became "General Rules recommended for Wiring for the Supply of Electrical Energy" with the third edition in 1897, "Wiring Rules" with the fifth edition of 1907, and settled at "Regulations for the Electrical Equipment of Buildings" with the eighth edition in 1924.

Since the 15th edition (1981), these regulations have closely followed the corresponding international standard IEC 60364. In 1992, the IEE Wiring Regulations became British Standard BS 7671 so that the legal enforcement of their requirements was easier both with regard to the Electricity at Work regulations and from an international point of view. They are now treated similar to other British Standards. BS 7671 has converged towards (and is largely based on) the European Committee for Electrotechnical Standardization (CENELEC) harmonisation documents, and therefore is technically very similar to the current wiring regulations of other European countries.

1st Edition 
"Rules and Regulations for the Prevention of Fire Risks arising from Electric Lighting." - Two core cable, line and neutral, no earth. The protection was a re-wirable fuse.

17th Edition 

The 17th edition, released in January 2008 and amended in 2011 ("Amendment 1"), 2013 ("Amendment 2") and January 2015  ("Amendment 3") became effective for all installations designed after 1 July 2008. One of the more significant changes is (chapter 41) that 30 mA RCDs will be required for socket outlets that are for use by ordinary persons and are intended for general use. This improves the level of protection against electrical shock in the UK to a level comparable to that in other EU countries, where the residual current breaker is usually found in the main- or group central. The 17th edition and its amendments incorporated new sections relating to microgeneration and solar photovoltaic systems, non-combustible consumer units, RCDs, and breakers (including high resilience breaker layout).

 As originally published highlights - RCDs required for most outlets
 Amendment 1 highlights - high resilience consumer units
 Amendment 2 highlights - electric vehicle charging added, earlier change incorporated for medical locations
 Amendment 3 highlights - non-combustible consumer units/enclosures

18th Edition

Timeline

See also
British Standards
Electrical wiring
Electrical wiring (UK)
IEC 60364
Earthing system

References

External links
 Wiring Regulations
 The 17th Edition Exam
 

07671
Electrical safety in the United Kingdom
Electrical standards
Electrical wiring